Charlie Ross Heaton (born 6 February 1994) is an English actor and musician. He is known for starring as Jonathan Byers in the Netflix science fiction horror series Stranger Things (2016–present) and for his roles in feature films like As You Are (2016), Marrowbone (2017), The New Mutants (2020), No Future (2021), and The Souvenir Part II (2021). Prior to his acting career, Heaton played in a number of London-based bands.

Early life
Heaton was born on 6 February 1994 in Leeds, West Yorkshire. He was raised by his mother on a council estate in Bridlington, a small coastal town in Yorkshire.

Career

2010–2014: Music
Heaton moved to London at age 16. He played in a number of bands before joining the noise-rock band Comanechi as the drummer. During his tenure, the band released an album in 2013 and toured for a year and a half. Heaton then joined London-based psychedelic band Half Loon.

2014–present: Acting and Stranger Things
Heaton has no formal acting training, first considering an acting career while working for extras and commercial agencies to supplement his income as a musician and bartender. 

2015 proved to be a pivotal year for Heaton; he had guest roles on a string of British television dramas and was cast in three major projects, including Stranger Things. He first appeared in the ITV crime drama series DCI Banks and Vera and then guest-starred in BBC One's medical drama series Casualty. In his first feature film role, he appeared in the 2016 thriller film Shut In, co-starring Naomi Watts and Oliver Platt, and directed by Farren Blackburn. The film was produced in early 2015, prior to being cast in Stranger Things, but was released following the show's premiere. Concurrently, he filmed the coming-of-age film As You Are in late 2015. It premiered at the Sundance Film Festival in January 2016. 

Heaton's breakthrough role was as Jonathan Byers in the Netflix supernatural drama series Stranger Things.  The first season premiered in July 2016 to critical acclaim; the most recent season, its fourth, was released in 2022. 

In 2017, Heaton had a main role in the psychological horror film Marrowbone. In May of that year, Heaton was cast to star as Samuel "Sam" Guthrie / Cannonball in the film The New Mutants based on the Marvel Comics comic book of the same name. Filmed in 2017, the film was released in 2020. In August 2018, the BBC announced that Heaton would be playing Joseph Merrick, commonly known as the "Elephant Man", in a new two-part drama. The casting drew criticism from a disability charity group, the group's head saying that not using a disabled actor was a missed opportunity. Ultimately, it was not produced.

In 2021, he starred opposite Catherine Keener in the independent film No Future and was part of the cast of the critically-acclaimed drama The Souvenir Part II.

Personal life
Heaton has a child with Akiko Matsuura, a former bandmate. Since 2016, he has been in a relationship with Stranger Things co-star Natalia Dyer, who plays his character’s girlfriend Nancy Wheeler in the series.

In October 2017, Heaton was detained at LAX Airport in Los Angeles for possession of small amounts of cocaine. He was not charged with a crime and was instead sent back to London. He was later allowed to return to the US to shoot the third season of Stranger Things.

Since first moving to London, Heaton became a keen football fan and an avid supporter of Arsenal F.C.

Filmography

Film

Television

Awards and nominations

References

External links
 

1994 births
English male film actors
English male television actors
Living people
People from Bridlington
Male actors from Leeds
21st-century English male actors
English rock drummers